Mike Bethel (born 21 April 1990) is a Bahamian footballer who plays for local side Renegades.

Club career
Bethel attended St. Andrews School and joined the University of Tampa in 2008, for whom he scored 4 goals in 36 matches. He later returned to the Bahamas to join Lyford Cay.

International career
He made his debut for the Bahamas national football team in a March 2008 World Cup qualification match against the British Virgin Islands. Bethel also played in the return match, scoring his first international goal. He had earned four caps by November 2008, all of them World Cup qualification games.

International goals
Scores and results list Bahamas' goal tally first.

Personal life
Born in Nassau, he is a son of Michael and Denise Bethel and has two sisters.

References

External links
 

1990 births
Living people
Sportspeople from Nassau, Bahamas
Association football midfielders
Bahamian footballers
Bahamas international footballers
Bahamian expatriate footballers
Expatriate soccer players in the United States
Tampa Spartans men's soccer players
BFA Senior League players
Bahamian expatriate sportspeople in the United States
Bahamas under-20 international footballers
Bahamas youth international footballers